Charles Victor Daremberg (14 March 1817, Dijon – 24 October 1872) was a French librarian, medical historian and classical philologist.

He began his medical studies in Dijon, later relocating to Paris, where he served as librarian of the Académie de Médecine and at the Bibliothèque Mazarine. Also, he gave lectures at the Collège de France and held the chair of Histoire de la médecine.

In the field of classical philology, he translated works by Galen and Hippocrates. With archaeologist Edmond Saglio (1828-1911), he was editor of Dictionnaire des Antiquités Grecques et Romaines, later published in ten volumes between 1877 and 1919.

References 
 This article incorporates text based on a translation of an equivalent article at the French Wikipedia, listed as:
 Académie nationale de médecine.
BIUM Bibliothèque d'histoire de la médecine et de l'art dentaire
Dictionnaire de Ch. Daremberg et E. Saglio (1877)

External links 
 BIUM  Santé Charles Victor Daremberg (1817-1872) et une histoire positiviste de la médecine (includes chronological bibliography)

1817 births
1872 deaths
19th-century French physicians
French medical historians
Writers from Dijon
French philologists
French librarians
French male non-fiction writers
19th-century French male writers
Physicians from Dijon